Only the Lonely is a 1991 American romantic comedy-drama film written and directed by Chris Columbus, produced by John Hughes, and stars John Candy, Maureen O'Hara (in her final film role), Ally Sheedy and Anthony Quinn. The film is a comedic take on the premise established in the 1953 television play Marty and the 1955 film Marty, while the title comes from the song "Only the Lonely" by Roy Orbison. The story follows a bachelor who is looking to settle down and start a family with a mortuary beautician, while coping with his overbearing mother who does not approve of her.

Plot
Danny Muldoon, a 38-year-old Chicago policeman, lives with his overbearing Irish mother, Rose Muldoon. A lonely bachelor, he falls in love with Theresa Luna, an introverted girl who works in her father's funeral home. On their first date, they have a picnic on Comiskey Park field. Dating becomes difficult as Rose fears Theresa is trying to steal her son away.

Danny's brother Patrick tries to convince him to remain unmarried and move to Florida with their mother to take care of her; Salvatore "Sal" Buonarte, one of Danny's married friends and a fellow officer, advises him not to settle down just yet, as he did. Danny begins to feel guilty about his relationship, especially towards his mother. This leads to his interrupting dates with Theresa to check on her.

When Theresa finally meets Rose at a fancy dinner, Rose immediately begins to put her down, mocking her Sicilian and Polish heritage. Theresa stands up to her, then berates Danny for not doing so himself. After Theresa leaves, Danny scolds his mother for being so cruel, saying that her way of "telling it like it is" hurts people. He reminds her she lost a $450,000 account for his late father's company by making anti-Semitic remarks. He then tells Rose he will propose to Theresa, whether she approves or not.

Danny apologizes to Theresa, proposing to her from the bucket of a Chicago fire truck. She says yes and they are set to be married. However, even though Rose finally approves, Danny calls to check on his mother in front of Theresa on the night before the wedding. Angered that they might never be alone, she walks off. Neither of them show up for the wedding. A few weeks later, Danny's friends ask why they called off the wedding, but he gives no answer. When a friend named Doyle suddenly passes away, alone with no wife or children, Danny realizes he doesn't want to end up that way.

Finally, the day Danny and Rose are scheduled to move to Florida, Danny tells Rose that he can't let Theresa go because she's the best thing that ever happened to him. Reluctant at first, Rose finally goes to Florida without him, telling him to get married, have a family and be happy. Danny then goes to the funeral home, looking for Theresa.  However, her father tells him that she left for New York City by train. Danny contacts the railroad station manager, who stops the train at a station outside the city. There, Danny apologizes to Theresa and proclaims his love for her. He tells her that he will move to New York with her and join the NYPD. Having no more guilt about his mother, they board the train for New York to live the rest of their lives together.

Throughout the film, the Muldoons' Greek neighbor, Nick Acropolis — who has been encouraging Danny to pursue Theresa — attempts to woo Rose. She initially resists, but as she gradually softens her stance regarding Danny's relationship with Theresa, she ultimately warms to Nick, who takes Danny's place on the flight to Florida with her.

Cast
 John Candy as Officer Daniel "Danny" Muldoon, Chicago Police Department
 Maureen O'Hara as Rose Muldoon
 Ally Sheedy as Theresa Luna
 Anthony Quinn as Nick Acropolis
 James Belushi as Officer Salvatore "Sal" Buonarte, Chicago Police Department
 Kevin Dunn as Patrick Muldoon
 Macaulay Culkin as Billy Muldoon
 Kieran Culkin as Patrick Muldoon, Jr.
 Milo O'Shea as Doyle
 Bert Remsen as Spats
 Joe Greco as Joey Luna

Production

Casting
Chris Columbus wrote the part of Rose specifically for Maureen O'Hara, but did not know that she had retired from acting and was living in the Virgin Islands. Columbus contacted O'Hara's younger brother Charles B. Fitzsimons, a producer and actor in the film industry, to ask him to send O'Hara a copy of the script, which he did, telling her, "This you do!". O'Hara read the script and loved it. She was reported to have replied to Fitzsimons, "This I do!". However, she would not commit until she met co-star John Candy.

Co-star Jim Belushi recounted this story: On the set of Only the Lonely, the producers stuck Maureen O’Hara in a tiny trailer. When John Candy complained on her behalf, he was told the budget was being spent on the picture, not on accommodations for old movie stars. Candy responded by giving O'Hara his trailer and going without one until the studio finally caved in and got a trailer for each actor.

John Hughes co-produced the film. This movie marked Macaulay Culkin's third film with Hughes and Candy (after Home Alone and Uncle Buck). Other than New Port South, it was the only film Hughes produced that he did not write.

Filming
Most of the film was shot on location in Chicago. Danny and Rose Muldoon's house is located at the intersection of Clark Street and Roscoe Street, as is the front façade of O'Neils' Pub. The inside of the pub was shot at Emmett's Pub, a Chicago landmark that was also used in Uncle Buck, another film with John Candy. At the request of producer John Hughes (a Chicagoan and big fan of the Chicago White Sox) and sports fan John Candy, the baseball stadium where Danny and Theresa's first date took place was arranged to be set at old Comiskey Park (home of the Chicago White Sox until 1990). Hughes hastily arranged the filming, as the stadium was slated to be torn down imminently. There is also a shot showing old Comiskey Park and the new Guaranteed Rate Field, the current home of the White Sox, under construction next door. Comiskey Park was located at the corner of 35th St. and Shields Ave., on the South Side of Chicago. The scene where Danny and Theresa kiss along Lake Michigan is located at Lincoln Park, Chicago, and the dinner scene was shot at One Ambassador East, also known as the Ambassador East Hotel, located at 1301 North State Parkway in Chicago's Gold Coast. The church scenes were filmed at St. John Cantius Church in West Town on 825 N Carpenter St.

The final scene with Danny and Theresa was shot at the Amtrak station in Niles, Michigan, which was renamed to Willoughby and decorated with Christmas lights for the filming.

Music
Roy Orbison's song "Only the Lonely" is played in its entirety in the movie's opening scene. "Someone Like You" by Van Morrison is played during one of Danny and Theresa's dates. "Dreams to Remember" by Etta James is played, also in its entirety. Also, "Pachelbel's Canon" is played briefly during the wedding scene. The film's original music was composed and conducted by Maurice Jarre.

The soundtrack album was released by Varèse Sarabande, featuring 28 minutes of Jarre's score and the songs "Only the Lonely" and "Someone Like You."

Reception
On Rotten Tomatoes, the film has an approval rating of 65% based on reviews from 23 critics, with an average rating of 6/10. On Metacritic, the film has a weighted average score of 47 out of 100 based on 21 critics, indicating "mixed or average reviews". Audiences polled by CinemaScore gave the film an average grade of "B+" on an A+ to F scale.

Entertainment Weekly gave it a grade C.

References

External links

 
 
 
 
 

1990s romantic comedy-drama films
1991 films
20th Century Fox films
American romantic comedy-drama films
1990s English-language films
Fictional portrayals of the Chicago Police Department
Films based on songs
Films scored by Maurice Jarre
Films directed by Chris Columbus
Films produced by John Hughes (filmmaker)
Films set in Chicago
Films shot in Chicago
Films shot in Michigan
Films with screenplays by Chris Columbus
Roy Orbison
1991 comedy films
1991 drama films
1990s American films